Owen Davys, (25 May 1794 - 7 February 1875) was  Archdeacon of Northampton from 1842 until his death.

Davys was born in Loughborough, and was educated at Uppingham School and  St John's College, Cambridge. He was ordained in 1818. He held incumbencies at  Humberstone, Cranwell, Rauceby and Fiskerton. He died in Peterborough, aged 80.

Notes

1794 births
People from Loughborough
People educated at Uppingham School
Alumni of St John's College, Cambridge
Archdeacons of Northampton
1875 deaths